Lefteris Nikolaou-Alavanos is a Greek politician currently serving as a Member of the European Parliament for the Communist Party of Greece.

On 2 March 2022, he was one of 13 MEPs who voted against condemning the Russian invasion of Ukraine.

On 15 September 2022, he was one of 16 MEPs who voted against condemning President Daniel Ortega of Nicaragua for human rights violations, in particular the arrest of Bishop Rolando Álvarez.

References

Living people
MEPs for Greece 2019–2024
Communist Party of Greece MEPs
Communist Party of Greece politicians
Year of birth missing (living people)
Politicians from Athens